Cook County Courthouse in Grand Marais, Minnesota, United States, was built in 1911 and designed by architects Anton Werner Lignell and Clyde Wetmore Kelly. It was listed on the National Register of Historic Places in 1983.

When Cook County was first organized, county business was conducted in a trading post on a spit of land that extended into Lake Superior.  The first real courthouse building was built in 1889 and was a  two-story frame building.  It later received a one-story  addition.  The original frame courthouse was seen as "obsolete, limited in space, and far too modest an expression of the county's future," so in 1910, voters authorized the sale of bonds to build a new courthouse.  The new building, completed in 1912, was built in the Classical Revival style and features Ionic columns supporting a cornice.  It stands on a hill overlooking the city of Grand Marais and Lake Superior.

References

Buildings and structures in Cook County, Minnesota
County courthouses in Minnesota
Courthouses on the National Register of Historic Places in Minnesota
Government buildings completed in 1911
Neoclassical architecture in Minnesota
1911 establishments in Minnesota
National Register of Historic Places in Cook County, Minnesota
Grand Marais, Minnesota
Anton Werner Lignell buildings